is a train station on the Hankyu Kyoto Line located in Yodogawa-ku, Osaka, Japan. It also serves as an interchange for Nishinakajima-Minamigata Station on the Osaka Municipal Subway Midosuji Line.

Connecting line from Minamikata
Osaka Municipal Subway Midosuji Line (Nishinakajima-Minamigata Station)

Layout
2 side platforms serve 2 tracks on the ground level.

History
The station was opened by Kita-Osaka Electric Railway on 1 April 1921.

Station numbering was introduced to all Hankyu stations on 21 December 2013 with this station being designated as station number HK-61.

Stations next to Minamikata

References

External links
 Minamikata Station from Hankyu Railway website 

Hankyu Kyoto Main Line
Railway stations in Osaka Prefecture
Railway stations in Japan opened in 1921